{{DISPLAYTITLE:N-Acetyl-L-tyrosine}}

N-Acetyl-L-tyrosine is an amino acid, an N-acetyl derivative of tyrosine. It is used for parenteral nutrition and as a dietary supplement.

See also 
 Acetylcarnitine
 Acetylcysteine
 N-Acetylserotonin

References 

Amino acid derivatives